Hypospila infimoides is a species of moth in the family Erebidae. It is found in Suriname.

References

Moths described in 1880
Hypospila